An argyle (occasionally spelled argyll) pattern is made of diamonds or lozenges. The word is sometimes used to refer to an individual diamond in the design, but more commonly refers to the overall pattern.  Most argyle contains layers of overlapping motifs, adding a sense of three-dimensionality, movement, and texture. Typically, there is an overlay of intercrossing diagonal lines on solid diamonds.

History 

The argyle pattern derives from the tartan of Clan Campbell of Argyll in western Scotland, used for kilts and plaids, and from the patterned socks worn by Scottish Highlanders since at least the 17th century. These were generally known as "tartan hose".

20th century 
Argyle knitwear became fashionable in Great Britain and then in the United States after the First World War of 1914–1918. Pringle of Scotland popularised the design, helped by its identification with the Duke of Windsor. Pringle's website says that "the iconic Pringle argyle design was developed" in the 1920s. The Duke, like others, used this pattern for golf clothing: both for jerseys and for the long socks needed for the plus-fours trouser fashion of the day.

Contemporary use 
Payne Stewart (1957–1999), who won the U.S. Open in 1991 and 1999 and the PGA championship in 1989, was known for his flashy tams, knickerbockers, and argyle socks.

Some sports teams use bright, contemporary interpretations of the argyle pattern. For example, the Norwegian men's curling team at the 2010 Winter Olympics and the Garmin–Slipstream professional cycling team, nicknamed the "Argyle Armada". On 27 April 2013 the professional soccer team Sporting Kansas City of Major League Soccer (MLS) in the United States announced their third kit of the 2013 season, featuring an argyle pattern. The University of North Carolina has used the argyle pattern for its basketball uniforms since 1991, and introduced it as alternate for all sports uniforms in 2015. The Belgian football team used such design in 1984, and has an updated version of it in 2018.

Knitting 
As a knitting pattern, argyle is generally accomplished using the intarsia technique. Argyle patterns are occasionally woven.

Gallery

See also
 Check (fabric)
 Flannel
 Harlequin print
 Houndstooth
 Madras (cloth)

References

External links 
 

Knitting ornaments
Scottish culture
Textile patterns
Scottish design
Scottish clothing